John Walton (25 October 1565; 30 August 1646) was an Anglican priest, who served as Archdeacon of Derby from 1603 until 1603.

Walton  was educated at the University of Oxford. He was appointed a Canon of Lichfield in 1567; Rector of Breadsall in 1577, and of Gedling from 1590 until his death on 1 June 1603.

References

Archdeacons of Derby
Alumni of the University of Oxford
1603 deaths